Pico Almanzor is the highest mountain in central Spain. It is made of granite. The mountain is also known as Pico de Almanzor and Moro Almanzor.

History
The mountain got its name from Al-Mansur (Arabic for "the victorious"). Al-Mansur Ibn Abi Aamir was a general and statesman in Muslim Spain (Caliphate of Cordoba) during the late 10th century. Muhammad bin Abi Amir was his real name; the Moors in Spain gave him the title of Al-Mansur due to his victories over the Christians.

During his many campaigns, Al-Mansur passed near this mountain and he was captivated by its beauty.

Pico Almanzor was climbed for the first time in September 1899 by M. González de Amezúa and José Ibrián. Espada, Ontañón and Abricarro made the first winter ascent in 1903. In 1960, a 1-metre-tall iron cross was placed on the summit.

See also
 Circo de Gredos

References

External links
 
 

Mountains of Castile and León
Almanzor
Geography of the Province of Ávila
Two-thousanders of Spain